Billy Crystal is an American actor, comedian, singer, writer, producer, director and television host. The filmography of his work as follows.

Crystal started his career  in the 1970s for playing Jodie Dallas on the ABC sitcom Soap and became a Hollywood film star during the late 1980s and 1990s, appearing in the critical and box office successes When Harry Met Sally... (1989), City Slickers (1991), and Analyze This (1999) and providing the voice of Mike in the Monsters, Inc. franchise. He has hosted the Academy Awards nine times from 1990 through the 84th Academy Awards in 2012.

Film

Television

Theatre

References

Filmography

External links
 

American filmographies
Director filmographies
Male actor filmographies